Warren Bell (born 23 July 1986) is a South African first-class cricketer. He was included in the Griqualand West cricket team squad for the 2015 Africa T20 Cup.

He was the leading wicket-taker in the 2017–18 CSA Provincial One-Day Challenge tournament for Northern Cape, with nine dismissals in five matches.

References

External links
 

1986 births
Living people
South African cricketers
Eastern Province cricketers
Griqualand West cricketers
Northern Cape cricketers
Warriors cricketers
Cricketers from Port Elizabeth